Fighting Squadron 2 or VF-2 was an aviation unit of the United States Navy. Originally established as VF-2 on 1 January 1927, it was redesignated VF-2B on 1 July 1927, redesignated as VF-2S on 1 July 1932, redesignated as VF-2B in April 1933, redesignated as VF-2 on 1 July 1937, it was disestablished on 1 July 1942. It was the second US Navy squadron to be designated as VF-2.

Operational history

World War II

At the time of the Japanese Attack on Pearl Harbor, VF-2 was flying the F2A Buffalo, but soon transitioned to the F4F Wildcat.

The squadron’s first combat occurred during the Battle of the Coral Sea, the world’s first engagement between aircraft carriers. On 7 May 1942, VF-2 escorted strike aircraft against the Japanese aircraft carrier Shōhō. VF-2 claimed 6 confirmed aerial kills and 3 probable kills. The next day, Japanese carriers Shokaku and Zuikaku exchanged air strikes with the US force, and VF-2 lost 5 aircraft while claiming 11 kills.  succumbed to torpedo damage and sank. Without an aircraft carrier, VF-2 was disestablished on 1 July  1942.

See also
History of the United States Navy
List of inactive United States Navy aircraft squadrons
List of United States Navy aircraft squadrons
VF-2 (1943-5)
VFA-2

References

External links

Strike fighter squadrons of the United States Navy